was a leading Japanese monthly trade magazine focusing on advertisement, especially TV commercials. It was published between 1979 and 2009.

History and profile
Kokoku Hihyo was started by Yukichi Amano in 1979. It was modeled on Creativity Magazine.

Kokoku Hihyo was published monthly by Madra Publishing. It offered news about new trends in advertising, creativity and new media. Amano also served as the editor-in-chief of the magazine.

On 9 April 2008 Kokoku Hihyo announced that it would be shut down in April 2009. The founder and editor-in-chief Amano stated that the magazine closed down due to the fact that the Internet age made advertising totally different phenomenon.

References

External links
 Official website 

1979 establishments in Japan
2009 disestablishments in Japan
Business magazines published in Japan
Defunct magazines published in Japan
Magazines about advertising
Magazines established in 1979
Magazines disestablished in 2009
Magazines published in Tokyo
Mass media trade magazines
Monthly magazines published in Japan